Rolesville High School is a public high school located in Rolesville, North Carolina, United States. The school opened in 2013 after the splitting of the former Wake Forest-Rolesville High School (now Wake Forest High School). The school is operated by Wake County Public School System.

References

External links

Schools in Wake County, North Carolina
Public high schools in North Carolina